Culture of the Western Balkans may refer to:

Culture of Albania
Culture of Kosovo
Culture of North Macedonia
Culture of Serbia
Culture of Montenegro
Culture of Bosnia and Herzegovina

See also
Culture of Europe
Cultural policies of the European Union